Evelyn Elizabeth Telfer  is a reproductive biologist and professor at the University of Edinburgh. She leads a research team which has successfully grown immature human eggs to maturity in the lab, and discovered that human ovaries are capable of growing new eggs. In 2018 she was named one of Porter magazine's Incredible Women of 2018. In January 2019 she delivered the Anne McLaren Memorial Lecture at the Joint Fertility Societies Meeting in Birmingham: Fertility 2019. The Society of Reproduction and Fertility (SRF) presented her with their Distinguished Scientist award. Professor Telfer was presented with the Marshall Medal by SRF at Fertility 2023 in Belfast in recognition of her world leading contributions to the field of ovarian function and fertility preservation. The Marshall Medal is the Society’s premier award established in 1963 to commemorate the life and work of the eminent physiologist FHA Marshall.

Education 
Telfer obtained her PhD from the University of Edinburgh  in 1987. Her thesis investigated factors influencing the development of ovarian follicles in mammals.

Career 
Telfer is currently a reproductive biologist and Professor of Reproductive Biology at the University of Edinburgh.

She is a former Associate Editor of Molecular Human Reproduction journal.

From 1987-1989, Telfer worked in the Department of Physiology at the University of Edinburgh. Here, she worked with the physiologist Roger Gosden to develop a culture systems to support murine follicle development, one of the first of its kind.

From 1989-1992 Telfer was a postdoctoral fellow in John Eppig's Laboratory at the Jackson Labs in Bar Harbor Maine. She was the recipient of a Rockefeller Foundation award.

She returned to the University of Edinburgh in 1992 as a lecturer and established a research group working on ovarian development.

She led research which, in 2016, found evidence that the human ovary may have the capability to grow new eggs in adulthood. However, Telfer warned against premature clinical applications in fertility treatments before the findings have been fully understood.

In 2018 she was named as one of Porter magazine's Incredible Women of 2018, recognised for her research growing oocyte cells to maturity in the lab, to the point at which they can be fertilised. The research was the first successful attempt to grow fully mature human eggs, where previously it had only been achieved for mouse eggs. The technique has implications for fertility treatment, in particular in women undergoing in vitro fertilisation and women who had their ovaries removed before cancer treatment. Telfer was the project leader, and co-authored an article publishing the research in the medical journal Molecular Human Reproduction in March 2018.

Telfer was appointed Commander of the Order of the British Empire (CBE) in the 2021 Birthday Honours for services to female reproductive biology.

References

External links 

 Evelyn Telfer - Edinburgh Research Explorer
 Video of Evelyn Telfer on the implications of her research to grow human eggs in the lab

British women biologists
Alumni of the University of Edinburgh
Academics of the University of Edinburgh
Scottish women scientists
Living people
Year of birth missing (living people)
Commanders of the Order of the British Empire